Tredegar Ironworks may refer to either of the two similarly named nineteenth-century ironworks:
Tredegar Iron Works, Virginia, United States 
Tredegar Iron and Coal Company, South Wales